Washington Jesús Ortega Olivera (born 13 November 1994) is a Uruguayan footballer who plays as a goalkeeper for La Equidad in the Categoría Primera A del fútbol colombiano.

External links
Washington Ortega at FOX Sports

1994 births
Living people
Canadian Soccer Club players
Sud América players
Uruguayan Primera División players
Uruguayan Segunda División players
Uruguayan footballers
Association football goalkeepers
People from Rivera Department